Katzsohlbach is a stream in Saxony-Anhalt, Germany. It flows through Katzsohlteich Pond, and joins the Selke River in Güntersberge.

See also
List of rivers of Saxony-Anhalt

Rivers of Saxony-Anhalt
Rivers of Germany